Ashley Elizabeth Priess (born March 8, 1990) is an American former artistic gymnast. She competed at the 2006 World Artistic Gymnastics Championships for the United States and earned a silver medal with the team. She attended the University of Alabama, where she competed for the Alabama Crimson Tide women's gymnastics team. While at Alabama the team won a gold, a silver and two bronze medals in the team competition at National Championships. She missed the 2011 season after double ankle surgery following the 2010 season.

Priess served as an associate head coach of Auburn from 2019 to 2022.  

On May 24, 2022, Ashley Priess-Johnston was named Head Coach of Alabama Gymnastics.

References

1990 births
Living people
American female artistic gymnasts
Medalists at the World Artistic Gymnastics Championships
Alabama Crimson Tide women's gymnasts
U.S. women's national team gymnasts